The 1979 St. Louis Cardinals season was the team's 98th season in St. Louis, Missouri and its 88th season in the National League. The Cardinals went 86-76 during the season and finished third in the National League East, 12 games behind the eventual NL pennant and World Series champion Pittsburgh Pirates.

Offseason 
 December 5, 1978: Pete Falcone was traded by the Cardinals to the New York Mets for Kim Seaman and Tom Grieve.
 January 9, 1979: Bill Mooneyham was drafted by the Cardinals in the 1st round (7th pick) of the secondary phase of the 1979 Major League Baseball Draft, but did not sign.
 January 16, 1979: Darold Knowles was signed as a free agent by the Cardinals.
 January 16, 1979: Benny Ayala was traded by the Cardinals to the Baltimore Orioles for Mike Dimmel.
 February 19, 1979: Will McEnaney was signed as a free agent by the Cardinals.

Regular season 
First baseman Keith Hernández won the MVP Award this year, along with Willie Stargell, batting .344, with 11 home runs and 105 RBIs. Hernández also won the Gold Glove. Left fielder Lou Brock collected his 3,000th career hit and played his final season in MLB.

Pete Vuckovich and Silvio Martínez each won 15 games.  Garry Templeton became the first switch-hitter to collect 100 hits from each side of the plate and led the league in triples for a third consecutive season.

Season standings

Record vs. opponents

Opening Day starters 
 Lou Brock
 John Denny
 George Hendrick
 Keith Hernandez
 Ken Reitz
 Tony Scott
 Ted Simmons
 Garry Templeton
 Mike Tyson

Notable transactions 
 June 5, 1979: Andy Van Slyke was drafted by the Cardinals in the 1st round (6th pick) of the 1979 Major League Baseball Draft.

Roster

Player stats

Batting

Starters by position 
Note: Pos = Position; G = Games played; AB = At bats; H = Hits; Avg. = Batting average; HR = Home runs; RBI = Runs batted in

Other batters 
Note: G = Games played; AB = At bats; H = Hits; Avg. = Batting average; HR = Home runs; RBI = Runs batted in

Pitching

Starting pitchers 
Note: G = Games pitched; IP = Innings pitched; W = Wins; L = Losses; ERA = Earned run average; SO = Strikeouts

Other pitchers 
Note: G = Games pitched; IP = Innings pitched; W = Wins; L = Losses; ERA = Earned run average; SO = Strikeouts

Relief pitchers 
Note: G = Games pitched; W = Wins; L = Losses; SV = Saves; ERA = Earned run average; SO = Strikeouts

Awards and honors 
 Lou Brock, Hutch Award

League records 
 Garry Templeton, National League record, league leader in triples for three consecutive seasons

League leaders 
 Garry Templeton, National League leader, triples

Farm system 

LEAGUE CHAMPIONS: Arkansas

References

External links
 1979 St. Louis Cardinals at Baseball Reference
 1979 St. Louis Cardinals team page at www.baseball-almanac.com

St. Louis Cardinals seasons
Saint Louis Cardinals season
St Louis